Rubén Gorospe (born 1 June 1964) is a Spanish former professional racing cyclist. He rode in one edition of the Tour de France, two editions of the Giro d'Italia and four editions of the Vuelta a España.

References

External links
 

1964 births
Living people
Spanish male cyclists
People from Durangaldea
Cyclists from the Basque Country (autonomous community)
Sportspeople from Biscay